Emilio Benini (5 July 1891 – 6 October 1958) was an Italian equestrian. He competed in the individual jumping event at the 1920 Summer Olympics.

References

1891 births
1958 deaths
Italian male equestrians
Olympic equestrians of Italy
Equestrians at the 1920 Summer Olympics
Sportspeople from Florence